Taiping New City Subdistrict is a subdistrict situated in eastern Anning City, Yunnan province, southwestern China. It lies about 12 km east of Anning City, situated at the western foot of the West Hill. Formerly a town (太平镇), its status changed to a subdistrict of Anning in 2011.

References

Anning, Yunnan
Township-level divisions of Kunming